Senggarang may refer to:

Senggarang (Malaysia), a small town in Johor, Malaysia
Senggarang (Indonesia), a small town in Indonesia
, a Singaporean coaster